Just Between Us may refer to:

Literature
 Just Between Us, a novel by Cathy Kelly
 Just Between Us..., a novel by Tori Carrington
 Just Between Us, a novel based on the American TV sitcom So Little Time
 Just Between Us, a Christian women's magazine founded by Jill Briscoe
 Greg Gorman: Just Between Us, a photography book by Greg Gorman
 "Natsuki Takaya's Just Between Us", a story serialized in the Japanese shōjo manga series Phantom Dream

Music
 Just Between Us (Norman Brown album), 1992
 Just Between Us (Ray Charles album), 1988
 Just Between Us, an album by Gerald Albright
 Just Between Us, an album by Rudy Linka
 "Just Between Us", a song by Randy Brecker from Into the Sun
 "Just Between Us", a song by Talisman from Talisman

Film, television and video
 Just Between Us (film), a 2010 Croatian film
 Just Between Us!, a TV interview show co-hosted by William Smithers
 Just Between Us, a documentary film that received a 2005 Reel Affirmations award
 Just Between Us, a pornographic film written by Jessica Drake
 Just Between Us, a YouTube comedy channel of Gabe Dunn and Allison Raskin